Gordon David Henry (August 17, 1926 – October 3, 1972) was a Canadian ice hockey goaltender for the Boston Bruins

Career 
Henry played three regular season games and five playoff games in the National Hockey League with the Boston Bruins between 1949 and 1951. The rest of his career, which lasted from 1943 to 1956, was mainly spent in the Eastern Amateur Hockey League and American Hockey League.

Career statistics

Regular season and playoffs

External links
 

1926 births
1972 deaths
Baltimore Clippers (1945–49) players
Boston Bruins players
Boston Olympics players
Canadian expatriate ice hockey players in the United States
Canadian ice hockey goaltenders
Charlotte Checkers (EHL) players
Hershey Bears players
Ice hockey people from Ontario
New York Rovers players
Ontario Hockey Association Senior A League (1890–1979) players
Philadelphia Falcons players
Philadelphia Ramblers players
Sportspeople from Owen Sound